Nkoya is a Bantu language of Zambia. It may be one of the Luba languages, and is at least Luban.

Maho (2009) considers the various varieties—Mbwera, Kolwe, Shangi, Shasha, and Nkoya proper—to be distinct languages in an Nkoya language cluster.

References

External links
 Nkoya basic lexicon at the Global Lexicostatistical Database

Luban languages
Languages of Zambia